The LaFollette House (also known as Glen Oaks) is an historic house in LaFollette, Tennessee, U.S.A.. It was built in the 1890s for Harvey Marion LaFollette, the owner of the LaFollette Coal and Iron Company. LaFollette also built the North Tennessee Railroad. His brother Grant lived in the house until he sold it to the Russell family in 1930. It sold to the Rogers family and still later to the Stone family.  In September 2020 the home sold to the current residents.

The house was designed in the Victorian architectural style. It has been listed on the National Register of Historic Places since May 29, 1975.

See also 
 Robert M. La Follette House:  La Follette family home in Maple Bluff, Wisconsin.

References

Houses on the National Register of Historic Places in Tennessee
Victorian architecture in Tennessee
Houses completed in 1892
Buildings and structures in Campbell County, Tennessee
House